Pascale Paradis-Mangon (born 24 April 1966) is a former professional tennis player from France.

Paradis was the World Junior Champion in women's singles in 1983. Although she failed to reach the heights predicted for her at that time, she did reach the quarterfinals at Wimbledon in 1988, defeating Manuela Maleeva, Nathalie Herreman, Robin White and Anne Minter before falling to Steffi Graf. She finished 1988 ranked number 20 on the WTA rankings. She won two doubles titles on the WTA Tour during her career. She retired in 1993 with a 137–158 win–loss record in singles.

WTA Tour finals

Singles: 3 (3 runner-ups)

Doubles: 6 (2 titles, 4 runner-ups)

ITF finals

Singles (2–1)

Doubles (2–3)

External links

 
 
 

1966 births
Living people
French female tennis players
French Open junior champions
Hopman Cup competitors
Sportspeople from Troyes
Wimbledon junior champions
Grand Slam (tennis) champions in girls' singles
20th-century French women